Puccinia cnici-oleracei is a plant pathogen that causes rust on species in the Asteraceae family.

See also
 List of Puccinia species

References

External links
 Index Fungorum

Fungal plant pathogens and diseases
cnici-oleracei